Thalai Nagaram is a 2006 Indian Tamil-language  action crime film written and directed by Suraj and produced by V. Ravichandran. The film stars Sundar C and Jyothirmayi, while Vadivelu, Prakash Raj, Bose Venkat, Judo. K. K. Rathnam, and K. S. Ravikumar play supporting roles. This film was a low-budget production but enjoyed huge success.  The soundtrack, composed by D. Imman, was a great hit, and the song "Yedho Ninaikiren" charted at the top position for a week. The film also has cinematography by K. S. Selvaraj and editing by Mu. Kasi Viswanath. The film, Naai Sekar Returns (2022), is a comedy spin-off of Vadivelu's character in this film.

The film is a remake of the Malayalam film Abhimanyu, directed by Priyadarshan and starring Mohanlal. The film tells the story of a man who sacrifices his life to kick out gangsters who ruin other's lives.

Plot
Subramaniam alias Right (Sundar C) is a rowdy in North Chennai. He runs a separate gang and also works as a sidekick and right-hand man to a big time Muslim don named Qaasim Bhai (Judo. K. K. Rathnam) who resides in North Chennai. Qaasim Bhai uses Right and his gang as professional killers whenever required.  ACP Ravikumar (K. S. Ravikumar) believes in his own type of law by eliminating criminals instead of wasting time by the court and other procedures. Divya (Jyothimayi) a student, surprisingly enters into Right's life and takes shelter in his house. However, things change after she enters his life; both of them fall in love. At a situation, there arises a clash between Right and Qaasim Bhai. Right's friend Balu (Bose Venkat) kills Qaasim Bhai's son Nassir (Vikas Rishi) for ordering a trucker who rams a convoy which killed innocent children instead of only killing the intended target. Unfortunately, Balu is killed by Qaasim Bhai for killing Nassir. After seeing Balu's death, Right decides to change his lifestyle.

Parallel narration is the comedy track of Naai Shekar (Vadivelu), Divya's supposed uncle who wants to become a criminal.

For Right's surprise enters a corrupt ACP named Gopinath (Prakash Raj). He is on a hell bent quest to eradicate crime. He dislikes Right's attitude to leave the underworld and threatens Divya, who is molested in prison. After coming to know of this, Right decides to eliminate all of his foes once and for all. He hatches a plan and orders a sniper shooter (Vichu Vishwanath) to kill the police inspector of the station. He also orders a trucker (G. K.) and kills the lady inspector. Right kills Gopinath and then plans to kill Qaasim Bhai for Balu's death. Qassim Bhai arrives at the hotel, where he sees his wife Vaani's (Bhuvaneswari) wristwatch in the bedroom, which was previously gifted to him by the corrupt MLA (Delhi Ganesh). Qassim Bhai mistakenly kills the MLA for having an affair with Vani. Right then strangulates Qassim Bhai when he arrives at the basement to board his car. Finally, Right arrives at the dock for a getaway with Divya only to be killed by a battalion of police officers due to the betrayal by Sashi (Sashikumar), his own fellow gang member who mistakenly thinks that Right was behind his sister's suicide.

Cast

Soundtrack

Box office
The film collected a distributor share of Rs 4 to 5 crores at the box office.

Legacy
Vadivelu's dialogue "trisha illana divya" ( If Not Trisha, Then Divya) inspired the title of a 2015 film Trisha Illana Nayanthara.

Spin-off
The character Naai Sekar performed by Vadivelu attained cult status. Suraj who directed this film will be making a spin-off film on this character titled Naai Sekar Returns with Vadivelu reprising the character.

Sequel
A sequel to the film,Thalai Nagaram 2 directed by V. Z. Durai began production in 2021. The casts stars Sundar C, Pallak Lalwani, Prabhakar and Thambi Ramaiah.

References

External links

 

2006 films
2000s Tamil-language films
Films scored by D. Imman
Indian gangster films
Tamil remakes of Malayalam films
Indian action films
2006 action films